Miss International Vietnam 2020, the second Miss International Queen Vietnam beauty pageant and a reality TV show, Perfect Ambassador. The finale was held on January 16, 2021, at Studio BHD, Ho Chi Minh City, Vietnam.

Miss International Queen Vietnam 2018 Đỗ Nhật Hà from Ho Chi Minh City handed over the crown to her successor Phùng Trương Trân Đài from California.

Results 

(§) - The candidates were eliminated before the finale but reached Top 3 in Most Popular Vote and went straight into the Top 9.

(¥) - Automatically entered Top 6 by winning Best Talent subsidiary award.

Order of announcements

Top 9

Cadie Huỳnh Anh
Phùng Trương Trân Đài
Mộng Thường
Nguyễn Khánh An
Lương Mỹ Kỳ
Nguyễn Phạm Tường Vi
Vũ Thu Phương
Nguyễn Đại Dương
Bolo Nguyễn

Top 6

Nguyễn Khánh An
Mộng Thường
Lương Mỹ Kỳ
Cadie Huỳnh Anh
Phùng Trương Trân Đài
Nguyễn Phạm Tường Vi

Top 3

Phùng Trương Trân Đài
Nguyễn Phạm Tường Vi
Lương Mỹ Kỳ

Official Scores

Special Awards

References

Miss International Queen Vietnam
Beauty pageants in Vietnam
Vietnamese awards
2020 beauty pageants